Annalis may refer to:

 Lex Villia annalis, a Roman law regulating age requirements for magistrates
 Lucius Villius Annalis, Roman politician, author of the lex Villia annalis, from which he acquired the surname
 Lucius Villius Annalis (praetor 43 BC)

See also